Glacial landforms are landforms created by the action of glaciers. Most of today's glacial landforms were created by the movement of large ice sheets during the Quaternary glaciations. Some areas, like Fennoscandia and the southern Andes, have extensive occurrences of glacial landforms; other areas, such as the Sahara, display rare and very old fossil glacial landforms.

Erosional landforms
As the glaciers expand, due to their accumulating weight of snow and ice they crush and abrade and scour surfaces such as rocks and bedrock. The resulting erosional landforms include striations, cirques, glacial horns, arêtes, trim lines, U-shaped valleys, roches moutonnées, overdeepenings and hanging valleys.

 Cirque: Starting location for mountain glaciers
 Cirque stairway: a sequence of cirques
 U-shaped, or trough, valley: U-shaped valleys are created by mountain glaciers. When filled with ocean water so as to create an inlet, these valleys are called fjords.
 Arête: spiky high land between two glaciers, if the glacial action erodes through, a spillway (or col) forms
 Valley step: an abrupt change in the longitudinal slope of a glacial valley

Depositional landforms

Later, when the glaciers retreated leaving behind their freight of crushed rock and sand (glacial drift), they created characteristic depositional landforms. Examples include glacial moraines, eskers, and kames. Drumlins and ribbed moraines are also landforms left behind by retreating glaciers. Many depositional landforms result from sediment deposited or reshaped by meltwater and are referred to as fluvioglacial landforms. The stone walls of New England contain many glacial erratics, rocks that were dragged by a glacier many miles from their bedrock origin.

 Esker: Built up bed of a subglacial stream.
 Kame: Irregularly shaped mound.
 Moraine: Feature can be terminal (at the end of a glacier), lateral (along the sides of a glacier), or medial (formed by the merger of lateral moraines from contributary glaciers).
 Outwash fan: Braided stream flowing from the front end of a glacier.

Glacial lakes and ponds
Lakes and ponds may also be caused by glacial movement. Kettle lakes form when a retreating glacier leaves behind an underground or surface chunk of ice that later melts to form a depression containing water. Moraine-dammed lakes occur when glacial debris dam a stream (or snow runoff). Jackson Lake and Jenny Lake in Grand Teton National Park are examples of moraine-dammed lakes, though Jackson Lake is enhanced by a man-made dam.

 Kettle lake: Depression, formed by a block of ice separated from the main glacier, in which the lake forms
 Tarn: A lake formed in a cirque by overdeepening
 Paternoster lake: A series of lakes in a glacial valley, formed when a stream is dammed by successive recessional moraines left by an advancing or retreating glacier
 Glacial lake: A lake that formed between the front of a glacier and the last recessional moraine

Ice features
Apart from the landforms left behind by glaciers, glaciers themselves may be striking features of the terrain, particularly in the polar regions of Earth.
Notable examples include valley glaciers where glacial flow is restricted by the valley walls, crevasses in the upper section of glacial ice, and icefalls—the ice equivalent of waterfalls.

Disputed origin
The glacial origin of some landforms has been questioned.

Erling Lindström has advanced the thesis that roches moutonnées may not be entirely glacial landforms taking most of their shape before glaciation. Jointing that contribute to the shape typically predate glaciation and roche moutonnée-like forms can be found in tropical areas such as East Africa and Australia. Further at Ivö Lake in Sweden weathered rock surfaces exposed by kaolin mining resemble roche moutonnée.

The idea of elevated flat surfaces being shaped by glaciation—the glacial buzzsaw effect—has been rejected by various scholars. In the case of Norway the elevated paleic surface has been proposed to have been shaped by the glacial buzzsaw effect. However, this proposal is difficult to reconcile with the fact that the paleic surface consist of a series of steps at different levels. Further glacial cirques, that in the buzzsaw hypothesis contribute to belevel the landscape, are not associated to any paleosurface levels of the composite paleic surface, nor does the modern equilibrium line altitude (ELA) or the Last Glacial Maximum ELA match any given level of the paleic surface. The elevated plains of West Greenland are also unrelated to any glacial buzzsaw effect.

The Gulf of Bothnia and Hudson Bay, two large depressions at the centre of former ice sheets, are known to be more the result of tectonics than of any weak glacial erosion.

See also 
 
 
 
Fluvioglacial Landforms
Glaciofluvial deposits

References

External links
 Illustrated glossary of alpine glacial landforms
 Landforms of glaciation
Diagram illustrating mechanisms of glacial landforms in The Ice Melts: Deposition on page 6 of "Pennsylvania and the Ice Age" published 1999 by PA DCNR Bureau of Topographic and Geologic Survey